Hayakawa Dam is an earthfill dam located in Gunma Prefecture in Japan. The dam is used for irrigation. The catchment area of the dam is 2.9 km2. The dam impounds about 10  ha of land when full and can store 1200 thousand cubic meters of water. The construction of the dam was completed in 1940.

References

Dams in Gunma Prefecture